Rosston is a small farming and ranching community in southwestern Cooke County, Texas, United States.  It lies along FM 922 along Clear Creek, midway between Forestburg in Montague County and Era in Cooke County.

In 2000, Rosston reported a population of 110. The community boasts a general store, a volunteer fire department, two church buildings, and several residences, as well as a wealth of agricultural enterprises.

Just east of the town, there is the Liberman Broadcasting Tower Era, one of earth's tallest structures, and as of May 2007 was the tallest structure in Texas. The tower is named for its proximity to Era, though it is much closer to Rosston and Leo.

History

Anglo settlement began as early as the Texas Revolution in Cooke County, drawing many to establish homesteads and ranches in the Rosston vicinity.

In 1865, the area of present-day Rosston was settled. The scattered community was promptly raided by tribes from Indian Territory in what would become the last raid of Indians on white settlers in Cooke County.  Settlers from Grayson County later established Rosstown in 1870.

The namesake Ross family owned a general store, cotton gin, and mill to serve the farmers of the area. A post office opened in 1872 and the town officially became Rosston. The Butterfield Overland Mail route passed near Rosston, operating between Gainesville in Cooke County and Jacksboro in Jack County, Texas.

Rosston, like many other small Texas towns, was bypassed by railway lines and slipped into relative obscurity in the 20th Century. But one local claim to fame is that notorious outlaw Sam Bass used Rosston as a hideout, and the town celebrates Sam Bass Day every year on the third Saturday in July.

References

Unincorporated communities in Texas
Unincorporated communities in Cooke County, Texas